Rapsodia Satanica is a 1915 Italian silent film directed by Nino Oxilia featuring Lyda Borelli in a female version of Faust based on poems by . Pietro Mascagni wrote his only film music for the film and conducted the first performance in July 1917. Mascagni was keen to take commission for the film music due to the financial burden of supporting two sickening brothers.

The French-German TV channel Arte restored the film in 2006 and Staatsphilharmonie Rheinland-Pfalz, conducted by Frank Strobel recorded Mascagni's score.

Cast
 Lyda Borelli as Contessa Alba d'Oltrevita
 Andrea Habay as Tristano
 Ugo Bazzini as Mephisto
 Giovanni Cini as Sergio

References

External links

1915 films
Italian silent feature films
The Devil in film
Films about wish fulfillment
Italian black-and-white films
Silent horror films